Ron Lagomarsino is an American film, theatre and television director.

Life and education
Lagomarsino is from San Francisco, California. He is an alumnus of Santa Clara University and Tisch School of the Arts.

Directing credits
His television credits include Pretty Little Liars, The Unit, Once and Again, Ghost Whisperer, The Brotherhood of Poland, New Hampshire, Big Shots, Homefront, Picket Fences, The Trials of Rosie O'Neill, My So-Called Life, What About Brian, Ally McBeal, Joan of Arcadia, Side Order of Life, Shark, Another World, thirtysomething, One Life to Live, Running Mates, Hart of Dixie, Baby Boom, Hooperman, Love Monkey, Snowglobe, Century City, My Sister's Keeper, The Fosters, Pop Rocks and Mistresses

Awards and nominations
In 1985, Lagomarsino was nominated for a Drama Desk Award: Outstanding Director of a Play, for the play, Digby. Two years later, he was nominated again for the play Driving Miss Daisy. He won his nomination for the 1993 Directors Guild of America Award: Outstanding Directorial Achievement in Dramatic Series for the series Picket Fences. He earned a single Daytime Emmy Award nomination in 1985 and Primetime Emmy Award in 1992 for One Life to Live and Homefront, respectively.

References

External links

American television directors
American theatre directors
Santa Clara University alumni
Tisch School of the Arts alumni
Living people
Year of birth missing (living people)
Film directors from San Francisco